Logan County Courthouse or Old Logan County Courthouse may refer to:

in the United States
(by state)
 Logan County Courthouse, Southern Judicial District, Booneville, Arkansas
 Logan County Courthouse, Eastern District, Paris, Arkansas
 Logan County Courthouse (Colorado), Sterling, Colorado
 Logan County Courthouse (Kansas), Oakley, Kansas
 Old Logan County Courthouse (Kansas), Russell Springs, Kansas
 Logan County Courthouse (North Dakota), Napoleon, North Dakota
 Logan County Courthouse (Ohio), Bellefontaine, Ohio
 Logan County Courthouse (Oklahoma), Guthrie, Oklahoma